Matías Ruíz Díaz (born 9 September 1996) is an Argentine professional footballer who plays as a right-back for Quilmes, on loan from Estudiantes.

Career
Ruíz Díaz started his senior career with Estudiantes, following youth spells with Fívica de Gonnet and Deportivo de City Bell. After first appearing as an unused substitute for a 2017 Copa Sudamericana match with Nacional Potosí on 13 July 2017, Ruíz Díaz made his professional debut in the following December during a league win away to Talleres. He made five further appearances during the 2017–18 season.

On 4 July 2019, Ruíz Díaz was loaned out to Guillermo Brown for the 2019-20 season. The loan was later extended until the end of 2021. In January 2022, he was loaned out to Central Córdoba SdE until the end of 2022. Due to lack of playing time, the loan spell was terminated on 11 June 2022, and Ruíz Díaz was instead sent out on loan at Primera Nacional side Quilmes for the rest of the year.

Career statistics
.

References

External links

1996 births
Living people
Footballers from La Plata
Argentine footballers
Association football defenders
Argentine Primera División players
Primera Nacional players
Estudiantes de La Plata footballers
Guillermo Brown footballers
Central Córdoba de Santiago del Estero footballers
Quilmes Atlético Club footballers